This is a listing of official video releases of the British comedy series The Goodies.

Series 1 – 8 (1970-80) were all made by the BBC, and initially broadcast on BBC2. Series 9 (1981-82) was made by LWT for ITV.

The Goodies episodes

DVD and pre-recorded VHS releases of episodes

Series One

Series Two
BBC title "The Goodies B"

Series Three
BBC title "The Goodies Series Three A"

Series Four
BBC title "The Goodies Series Three B"

Series Five
BBC title "The Goodies 1974 / The Goodies Autumn 1974 (last six episodes)"

Series Six
BBC title "The Goodies: Series Five / Series V"

Series Seven
BBC title "The Goodies: Autumn 1977"

Series Eight

Series Nine

DVD releases in chronological order

The Goodies ...At Last
Australian title "The Goodies: 8 Delicious Episodes"

 Tower of London
 Gender Education
 Kitten Kong (1972 Montreux)
 The Goodies and the Beanstalk
 Kung Fu Kapers
 Lighthouse Keeping Loonies
 Earthanasia
 Saturday Night Grease
Bonus features include:
 * commentaries on three episodes (Kitten Kong, Beanstalk, & Lighthouse)
 * storyboards
 * out-takes
 * surviving Broaden Your Mind footage
 * laughter-free track on Goodies and the Beanstalk
 * a digital restoration featurette

The Goodies ...At Last a Second Helping
Australian title "The Goodies: a Tasty Second Helping"

 Radio Goodies
 Come Dancing
 The Movies
 South Africa
 Bunfight at the O.K. Tea Rooms
 The End
 Scoutrageous
 Punky Business
Bonus features include:
 * commentaries on three episodes (The Movies, South Africa, & The End)
 * the Gymnasium sketch from A Collection of Goodies
 * Crackerjack clip (of The Goodies singing “A Man’s Best Friend is His Duck”)
 * Goodies Christmas Night with the Stars 1972 clip (aka The Goodies Travelling Instant Five-Minute Christmas)
 * commemorative booklet
 * restoration featurette
 * The Goodies in Conversation featurette
 * original script PDFs

The Goodies – Volumes 1 & 2
Australian title "The Goodies – The Tasty Box"

 Tower of London
 Gender Education
 Kitten Kong (1972 Montreux)
 The Goodies and the Beanstalk
 Kung Fu Kapers
 Lighthouse Keeping Loonies
 Earthanasia
 Saturday Night Grease
 Radio Goodies
 Come Dancing
 The Movies
 South Africa
 Bunfight at the O.K. Tea Rooms
 The End
 Scoutrageous
 Punky Business
Bonus features include:
 * commentaries on six episodes (Kitten Kong, The Goodies and the Beanstalk, Lighthouse Keeping Loonies, The Movies, South Africa, & The End)
 * storyboards
 * out-takes
 * surviving Broaden Your Mind footage
 * laughter-free track on Goodies and the Beanstalk
 * digital restoration featurettes
 * the Gymnasium sketch from A Collection of Goodies
 * a Crackerjack clip (of The Goodies singing “A Man’s Best Friend is His Duck”)
 * the Goodies Christmas Night with the Stars 1972 clip (aka The Goodies Traveling Instant Five-Minute Christmas)
 * a commemorative booklet
 * The Goodies in Conversation featurette
 * original script PDFs

The Goodies – The Complete LWT Series
 Australian Title "The Goodies – The Final Episodes"

 Snow White 2
 Robot
 Football Crazy
 Big Foot
 Change of Life
 Holiday
 Animals Are People Too
Bonus features include:
 * commentaries on two episodes (Change of Life and Holidays)
 * various 1975 Goodies musical performances from Shangalang (Funky Gibbon and Black Pudding Bertha) and Look Alive (Nappy Love, Wild Thing, and Make a Daft Noise for Christmas)
 * archive interviews from Sunday Sunday (1983) and This Morning (1993 and 1994), plus a 1978 interview with Tim & Graeme at the Cambridge Arts Theatre
 * a complete episode of Doctor in the House.  The episode is Doctor on the Box, written by Graeme Garden & Bill Oddie and including a cameo appearance from Graeme
 * a complete episode of From the Top (entitled Growing Up...and Out), written by Bill Oddie & Laura Beaumont and starring Bill
 * a 1981 clip of Tim judging a turkey competition
 * original script PDFs
 * a stills gallery
 * a booklet written by Andrew Pixley

The Goodies ...At Last – Back for More, Again
 Australian title "The Goodies ...At Last ...Back For More, Again!"

 Cecily
 The Music Lovers
 The New Office
 The Goodies Rule – O.K.?
 Camelot
 It Might As Well Be String
 2001 & A Bit
 Royal Command
Bonus features include:
 * a booklet written by Andrew Pixley

The Goodies ...At Last (Repackaged)

 Tower of London
 Gender Education
 Kitten Kong (1972 Montreux)
 The Goodies and the Beanstalk
 Kung Fu Kapers
 Lighthouse Keeping Loonies
 Earthanasia
 Saturday Night Grease
Bonus features include:
 * a booklet written by Andrew Pixley

The Goodies ...At Last a Second Helping (Repackaged)

 Radio Goodies
 Come Dancing
 The Movies
 South Africa
 Bunfight at the O.K. Tea Rooms
 The End
 Scoutrageous
 Punky Business
Bonus features include:
 * a booklet written by Andrew Pixley

The Goodies ...At Last the 40th Anniversary

 Tower of London
 Gender Education
 Kitten Kong (1972 Montreux)
 The Goodies and the Beanstalk
 Kung Fu Kapers
 Lighthouse Keeping Loonies
 Earthanasia
 Saturday Night Grease
 Radio Goodies
 Come Dancing
 The Movies
 South Africa
 Bunfight at the O.K. Tea Rooms
 The End
 Scoutrageous
 Punky Business
 Cecily
 The Music Lovers
 The New Office
 The Goodies Rule – O.K.?
 Camelot
 It Might As Well Be String
 2001 & A Bit
 Royal Command
 Snow White 2
 Robot
 Football Crazy
 Big Foot
 Change of Life
 Holiday
 Animals Are People Too
Bonus features include:
 * commentaries on two episodes (Change of Life and Holidays)
 * various 1975 Goodies musical performances from Shangalang (Funky Gibbon and Black Pudding Bertha) and Look Alive (Nappy Love, Wild Thing, and Make a Daft Noise for Christmas)
 * archive interviews from Sunday Sunday (1983) and This Morning (1993 and 1994), plus a 1978 interview with Tim & Graeme at the Cambridge Arts Theatre
 * a complete episode of Doctor in the House.  The episode is Doctor on the Box, written by Graeme Garden & Bill Oddie and including a cameo appearance from Graeme
 * a complete episode of From the Top (entitled Growing Up...and Out), written by Bill Oddie & Laura Beaumont and starring Bill
 * a 1981 clip of Tim judging a turkey competition
 * original script PDFs
 * a stills gallery
 * four booklets written by Andrew Pixley

The Complete BBC Collection

In 2018, a DVD box set was released which contained all the surviving BBC episodes of the show from 1970 to 1980, including specials.  The set was released on 24 September 2018.  A Special Edition of the box set was also released, called 'A Binge Of Goodies' and included all the episodes of the BBC series as per the standard edition, plus two collectors books and an audio CD featuring original music from the series. The set had a limited run of 1000 units.

VHS releases

1980s

"The Goodies (1982)" — Thorn EMI Video
 Football Crazy
 Robot
 Big Foot
 Change of Life

"The Goodies and the Beanstalk (1983)" — BBC Enterprises Limited
 The Goodies and the Beanstalk

"The Goodies (1986)" — Thorn EMI Video
 Football Crazy
 Change of Life

1990s

"Look out! It's ... The Goodies (1994)" — BBC Enterprises Limited
 Kitten Kong (72' Montreux)
 Scatty Safari
 Scoutrageous

"Look out! It's ... The Goodies (1994)" — BBC Worldwide Ltd for release on ABC Video in Australia)
 The Goodies and the Beanstalk
 The End
 Bunfight at the O.K. Tea Rooms

"Look out! It's ... The Goodies (1999) [US Reissue]" — BBC Enterprises Limited
 Kitten Kong ('72 Montreux)
 Scatty Safari
 Scoutrageous

2000s

"The Goodies ...At Last (2003)" — Network DVD

 Tower of London
 Gender Education
 Kitten Kong (72' Montreux)
 The Goodies and the Beanstalk
 Kung Fu Kapers
 Lighthouse Keeping Loonies
 Earthanasia
 Saturday Night Grease

References

 "The Complete Goodies" — Robert Ross, B T Batsford, London, 2000
 "The Goodies Rule OK" — Robert Ross, Carlton Books Ltd, Sydney, 2006
 "From Fringe to Flying Circus — 'Celebrating a Unique Generation of Comedy 1960–1980'" — Roger Wilmut, Eyre Methuen Ltd, 1980
 "The Goodies Episode Summaries" — Brett Allender
 "The Goodies — Fact File" — Matthew K. Sharp

External links
BBC page – information about missing Goodies episodes

Videography
DVDs and VHS